William Reaper Hall (3 May 1902 – 1 May 1963) was an Australian trade unionist and politician who served as a Labor Party member of the Legislative Council of Western Australia from 1938 until his death, representing North-East Province.

Hall was born in Boulder, Western Australia. He attended state schools in Kalgoorlie and then began working as a miner. Hall later began working for the Kalgoorlie Tramways, and eventually became secretary of the Tramway Employees' Union. He was elected to the Kalgoorlie Road Board in 1933 and would serve until 1949, including as chairman from 1935. 

Hall entered parliament in 1938, defeating Catherine Reid Elliott, MBE, widow of the previous incumbent, Charles Elliott. He was re-elected in 1944, 1950, 1956, and 1962, and in 1954 was made chairman of committees. Hall died in Perth two days before his 61st birthday in 1963. Hall married Dulcie Tangney in 1922; the couple had two daughters.

References

1902 births
1963 deaths
Australian Labor Party members of the Parliament of Western Australia
Australian trade unionists
Chairmen of Committees of the Western Australian Legislative Council
Mayors of places in Western Australia
Members of the Western Australian Legislative Council
People from Boulder, Western Australia
Western Australian local councillors